Parapsyche is a genus of netspinning caddisflies in the family Hydropsychidae. There are more than 20 described species in Parapsyche.

Species
These 25 species belong to the genus Parapsyche:

 Parapsyche acuta Schmid, 1964
 Parapsyche aias Malicky, 1997
 Parapsyche almota Ross, 1938
 Parapsyche angularia Mey, 1996
 Parapsyche apicalis (Banks, 1908)
 Parapsyche asiatica Schmid, 1959
 Parapsyche aureocephala Schmid, 1964
 Parapsyche bifida Schmid, 1959
 Parapsyche birmanica Schmid, 1968
 Parapsyche cardis Ross, 1938
 Parapsyche denticulata Schmid, 1964
 Parapsyche difformis (Banks, 1947)
 Parapsyche elsis Milne, 1936
 Parapsyche extensa Denning, 1949
 Parapsyche intawitschajanon Malicky & Chantaramongkol, 1992
 Parapsyche kchina Schmid, 1968
 Parapsyche kurosawai (Kobayashi, 1956)
 Parapsyche maculata (Ulmer, 1907)
 Parapsyche mahati Schmid, 1968
 Parapsyche shikotsuensis (Iwata, 1927)
 Parapsyche sinensis (Martynov, 1909)
 Parapsyche spinata Denning, 1949
 Parapsyche tchandratchuda Schmid, 1968
 Parapsyche turbinata Schmid, 1968
 Parapsyche variyasi Schmid, 1968

References

Further reading

 
 
 

Trichoptera genera
Articles created by Qbugbot